LOHAS Park is an MTR station on the  of the MTR system in Hong Kong. It opened on 26 July 2009.

Location
The station serves a residential project called LOHAS Park (formerly "Dream City") at Area 86. The first tenders for the construction of Phase 1 were completed in January 2005. Next to the Tseung Kwan O line Depot, it is the easternmost railway station in Hong Kong.

Transit-oriented development
In accordance with both MTR's "Rail + Property" funding scheme and one of the goals of the Tseung Kwan O line being to connect large housing estates on the eastern side of Victoria Harbour to Hong Kong Island, LOHAS Park is a site for transit-oriented development.

History
During the construction stages, the station was temporarily named Tseung Kwan O South, after its location in the southern part of the Tseung Kwan O New Town.

Since the station opened on 26 July 2009, the Tseung Kwan O line has been split into two branches at Tseung Kwan O, with the original northern branch towards , and the new southern branch towards LOHAS Park.

Service controversy
To operate the branch, MTR instituted a "3+1" service whereby every fourth train runs to LOHAS Park. After 8 December 2014, MTR instituted a "2+1" service in peak hours. During off peak and Sundays, a shuttle train between LOHAS Park and Tiu Keng Leng would operate. This is one example when the "terminus" of some trains are within intermediate stations.

Although MTR compensated for the slight reduction of service by decreasing headways by ten seconds to 2.5 minutes, residents and passengers have complained that the branched nature of the line has increased delays. MTR says that its on-time rate is still 99.9%.

Station layout

There are two platform faces on an island platform. Like in other underground MTR stations, platform screen doors have been installed.

Entrances and exits

Podium (U3)
C: LOHAS Park
C1: LOHAS Park, LOHAS Youth S.P.O.T., The Capitol, Le Prestige, Le Prime, La Splendeur
C2: LOHAS Park

Concourse (U2)
B: The LOHAS, Public Transport Interchange

Gallery

See also
 LOHAS Park
 Tseung Kwan O New Town

References

MTR stations in the New Territories
Tseung Kwan O line
Tseung Kwan O
Railway stations in Hong Kong opened in 2009